Ebrahimabad-e Zarduiyeh (also Romanized as Ebrāhīmābād-e Zardū’īyeh; also known as Ebrāhīmābād and Ebrāhīm Zardū) is a village in Zeydabad Rural District, in the Central District of Sirjan County, Kerman Province, Iran. At the 2006 census, its population was 185, in 54 families.

References 

Populated places in Sirjan County